Ghadames Airport  is located  east of Ghadames, Libya. Currently Libyan Airlines uses the airport for scheduled service to Tripoli.

Airlines and destinations

See also
Transport in Libya
List of airports in Libya

References

External links
OurAirports - Ghadames Airport

Ghadames
Airports in Libya